Ole Hjelmhaug (born 27 May 1976) is a retired Norwegian football defender and later manager.

He played two periods for Sogndal and one for Bryne, and was capped on most youth levels for Norway.

Hjelmhaug started a coaching career in 2010, being hired in Stord IL. In 2012 he rejoined Bryne as assistant manager, being promoted to manager in 2016. He was sacked in 2018. In September 2020 he was hired by Ålgård FK.

References

1976 births
Living people
Norwegian footballers
Sogndal Fotball players
Bryne FK players
Eliteserien players
Norwegian First Division players
Association football defenders
Norway youth international footballers
Norway under-21 international footballers
Norwegian football managers
People from Lærdal
Sportspeople from Vestland